Walter Kenrick Knight-Adkin  (17 August 1880 – 24 May 1957) was an Anglican priest in the first half of the 20th century.

Ecclesiastical career
Born in Cheltenham, Knight-Adkin was educated at Cheltenham College and St Edmund Hall, Oxford.  He did his pastoral training at Wells Theological College. Ordained in June 1908 at St Paul's Cathedral in London, he was a Curate at Kentish Town before commencing a long period of  service on 31 April 1910 as a Chaplain with the Royal Navy rising to become  Chaplain of the Fleet from 1929 to 1933, after which he was Dean of Gibraltar. Evacuated to England in 1941 due to illness, he became civilian Vicar of Sparkwell then Chaplain to the Lord Mayor of Bristol at St Mark`s Church, College Green.

He was awarded the OBE in 1919 and appointed a Companion of the Order of the Bath in 1932. On 25 January 1929 he was appointed as Honorary Chaplain to HM King George V.  He was an Honorary Canon of Portsmouth Cathedral and was appointed Deputy Lieutenant of Gloucester and of Bristol on 3 June 1950.

Family

Knight-Adkin was the second son of the Rev Harry Kenrick Knight-Adkin (1851–1928) and Georgina Elizabeth Knight (1849–1930).  He was born in Cheltenham on 17 August 1880.

He married Elizabeth Cuff Napier (1891–1984) at St. Andrew's-by-the-Green, Glasgow on 20 December 1915.  His bride was the daughter of Colonel Alexander Napier RAMC.  They had one child, Peter Napier Knight-Adkin, who died at Portsmouth in 1918.

Walter died at his home at 17 Miles Road, Bristol on 24 May 1957.  His wife was to live a further 27 years.
 
His elder brother was the war poet James Harry Knight-Adkin.  His younger brother, Frederick John Knight-Adkin, after a period working as a journalist and author in New York, emigrated to Argentina where he became a successful cattle rancher.  He had two sisters, Georgina Noel Knight-Adkin, a photographer in Bristol, and Violet Doris Knight-Adkin who died at the age of 19.

Naval career
 1910 HMS Lancaster
 1912 
 1913 HMS Conqueror
 1916 
 1919 HMS Revenge
 1920 RN College Dartmouth
 1923 HMS Queen Elizabeth
 1924 
 1929 Royal Naval College, Greenwich

References

1880 births
People educated at Cheltenham College
Alumni of St Edmund Hall, Oxford
Church of England archdeacons (military)
Officers of the Order of the British Empire
Deans of Gibraltar
Honorary Chaplains to the King
Companions of the Order of the Bath
1957 deaths
Chaplains of the Fleet
World War I chaplains
Alumni of Wells Theological College
Royal Navy chaplains
Royal Navy officers of World War I